Parvati Khan ( Maharaj) is a pop singer and model, who sang the song Jimmy Jimmy Aaja in the 1982 Bollywood hit movie Disco Dancer, which won a Gold Disc award. She is also known for the song Khula Tala Chod Aayi.

Early life
Parvati Khan (née Maharaj) was born into a Hindu Indian family in Trinidad and Tobago. At the age of 12 she had won Mastana Bahar, a TV talent contest in Trinidad and Tobago. Later she studied in England to be a nurse.

Career
Parvati Khan is known for her work in Disco Dancer (1982), Love Love Love (1989) and Maa Kasam (1985). In year 2000, she made a presentation of her peace and unity compositions at global concert held at UNGA Hall, New York. From 2002 onwards she has taken to singing Bhajans devoted to Lord Shiva, Shirdi Sai Baba, Ma Amritanandamayi, and other Hindu Deities. She is globally acclaimed for her song "Jimmy Jimmy", which got prestigious 'Golden Peacock Award' by China.

After years, Parvati Khan made her comeback in singing upon personal invitation made by Bappi Lahiri for his programme held at Shanmukhanand Hall, Mumbai, Maharashtra, India on 2 June 2017.

Personal life
Parvati is married to the Bollywood director and cinematographer Nadeem Khan, son of Dr. Rahi Masoom Raza. She has a son named Jatin with him.

She stirred up significant controversy in India by offering prayers in Kashi Vishwanath temple, she admitted to having performed abhishek at the temple in Varanasi during Mahashivratri despite having been banned earlier from doing so due to opposition from the Shiv Sainiks in 2004. She has also embarked on a number of other projects including serving as a spiritual guru at the Tihar Jail, believing that she has been chosen as a peace envoy. With an intention to promote peace, unity, love and oneness, she has visited various prisons of India and held 'satsang'.

References 

Living people
Year of birth missing (living people)
Indian women pop singers
Indian Hindus
People of Indo-Trinidadian descent
Bollywood playback singers